Guy Roderick Wilkinson  (born 1968 at Ashton-under-Lyne)  is a particle physicist, working on the Large Hadron Collider project at CERN, professor of physics at the University of Oxford and a Fellow of Christ Church, where he holds the college's Alfred Moritz Studentship.

Education
Wilkinson was educated at Bishop's Stortford College, Imperial College London and the University of Oxford where he was awarded a DPhil degree at Magdalen College in 1993 for a study of B⁰B⁰ oscillations at the Z⁰ resonance.

Career and research
Wilkinson's career began in the study of electroweak physics on the DELPHI experiment, taking part in the measurement of the mass and width of the Z boson, and the mass of the W boson. Wilkinson currently specialises in CP-violation through measurements of processes involving the decays of hadrons containing beauty or charm quarks. He is a founding member and former spokesperson of the LHCb experiment on the Large Hadron Collider at CERN.

Awards and honours
In 2017 he was awarded the James Chadwick Medal and Prize by the Institute of Physics (IOP) for his work on heavy quarks. He was elected a Fellow of the Royal Society (FRS) in 2018.

References

Living people
1968 births
Academics of the University of Oxford
Fellows of the Royal Society
21st-century British physicists
People educated at Bishop's Stortford College
Alumni of Imperial College London
Alumni of Magdalen College, Oxford
Fellows of Christ Church, Oxford
People associated with CERN